One Workplace is a commercial office furniture dealership in Northern California. It is headquartered in Santa Clara, California and has regional offices in Oakland, California and San Francisco, California. One Workplace sells office cubicles, chairs, desks, tables, movable walls, office accessories, storage cabinets, whiteboards, and audiovisual systems. It is a privately held company.

History 
One Workplace opened in 1925 in downtown San Jose, California as a family-owned bookstore. Its original name was Lindsay’s. Soon the company began to sell office supplies. When the Ferrari family purchased partial ownership, its name became Lindsay Ferrari and the company transitioned to selling office furniture. The Ferrari’s acquired complete ownership of Lindsay Ferrari and the company’s name became One Workplace.

One Workplace works with several vertical markets, including education, healthcare, corporate offices, government, bioscience, and financial institutions. In November 2008, the company launched two separate divisions: Synergy 4 Health and Architectural Environments. Synergy 4 Health focuses on the healthcare sector and Architectural Environments sells movable walls, floors, lighting, and acoustical treatments.

Notes and references

External links
 Official Site

Furniture retailers of the United States
American companies established in 1925
Retail companies established in 1925
Companies based in San Jose, California
1925 establishments in California